NTAP is an acronym for nonprofit technology assistance provider.

The term generally refers to organizations and individuals that specialize in providing information and communication technology support to nonprofit organizations, without regard for whether the provider itself is formally incorporated as a nonprofit entity or a for-profit business.

Nonprofit technology assistance provider is distinguished from a "nonprofit management assistance provider." The latter focuses on building organizational capacity in all areas of nonprofit management, some of which may include technology assistance. Readers should also understand that the term "technical assistance" has historically covered any form of capacity building assistance, technological or otherwise.

See also
Circuit rider (Technology)
Nonprofit technology
The Nonprofit Technology Enterprise Network (NTEN)
TechFoundation

Non-profit technology
 Nonprofit Technology News